Slov-Matic FOFO Bratislava is a futsal club based in Bratislava, Slovakia.

Current squad

Official staff
 Head coach: Jan Janik  
 Assistant of the coach: Matej Vlašič
 Medical doctor: Igor Blaško 
 Physiotherapist: Daniel Klačko
 Sport manager: Martin Grendar junior 
 Press and media manager: Vladimir Ambrozek

Honours

National
8 Slovak Futsal Extraliga: 2005, 2006, 2007, 2008, 2010, 2011, 2012, 2013
9 Slovak Futsal Cup: 2005, 2006, 2007, 2008, 2009, 2010, 2011, 2012, 2013

See also
Futsal in Slovakia

Externan link
Official Website

Futsal clubs in Slovakia